Acacia Alley (Kocheh Aghaghia) is an Iranian Drama and Comedy series. The series is directed by Reza Attaran.

Storyline 
The series is about an old man who lives in his old house. His wife Golnesa died a few years ago, But he has been dreaming of her for some time and he talks to her about different issues. These dreams cause her children to worry about their father's health and to gather together in their father's house. Their presence together, creates humorous adventures...

Cast 
 Manoochehr Nozari
 Bagher Sahraroodi
 Alireza Jafari
 Ali Sadeghi
 Reza Attaran
 Afshin Sangchap
 Reza Shafiei Jam
 Majid Salehi
 Shaghayegh Dehghan
 Zohreh Mojabi
 Aref Lorestani
 Katayun Amir Ebrahimi
 Yousef Teymouri
 Shahab Asgari
 Roshanak Ajamian
 Akbar Doodkar
 Saeed Nourollahi
 Khashayar Rad
 Zohreh Mojabi
 Saghi Zinati
 Mohammad Reza Haghgoo
 Yousef Pashandi
 Saman Golriz
 Hossein Shahab
 Koorosh Masoumi
 Fatemeh Daneshzad

References

External links
 

Iranian comedy television series
2000s Iranian television series
Iranian drama television series